Mordaunt Henry Caspers Doll (5 April 1888 – 30 June 1966) was an English first-class cricketer.

The son of Charles Fitzroy Doll, he was educated at Charterhouse School where he excelled as a schoolboy cricketer between 1905 and 1907. He scored 195 runs against Westminster School in his final year at school as he and RLL Braddell put on a stand of 214 in the last hour. From Charterhouse he went up to Trinity College, Cambridge.

He was a hard hitting right-handed batsman who represented MCC (1907–1920), Cambridge University (1908), Demobilised Officers (1919), Etceteras XI (1910), Hertfordshire (1907–1909), Middlesex (1912–1919) and PF Warner's XI (1919).

Doll scored 102 not out in a county record eighth wicket stand of 182 in two hours with Joe Murrell for Middlesex against Nottinghamshire at Lord's in 1913. He toured the West Indies in 1912/1913 with an MCC team led by Arthur Somerset.

His brother, Christian, was also a first-class cricketer.

References

External links

1888 births
1966 deaths
English cricketers
Cambridge University cricketers
Hertfordshire cricketers
Marylebone Cricket Club cricketers
Middlesex cricketers
People educated at Charterhouse School
Alumni of Trinity College, Cambridge
Demobilised Officers cricketers
P. F. Warner's XI cricketers